On Crimes and Punishments is a treatise written by Cesare Beccaria in 1764.

The treatise condemned torture and the death penalty and was a founding work in the field of penology.

History 
Beccaria and the two brothers Pietro and Alessandro Verri started an important cultural reformist movement centered around their journal Il Caffè ("The Coffee House"), which ran from the summer of 1764 for about two years, and was inspired by Addison and Steele's literary magazine The Spectator and other such journals. Il Caffè represented an entirely new cultural moment in northern Italy. With their Enlightenment rhetoric and their balance between topics of socio-political and literary interest, the anonymous contributors held the interest of the educated classes in Italy, introducing recent thought such as that of Voltaire and Denis Diderot.

On Crimes and Punishments marked the high point of Milan Enlightenment. In it, Beccaria put forth some of the first modern arguments against the death penalty. It was also the first full work of penology, advocating reform of the criminal law system. The book was the first full-scale work to tackle criminal reform and to suggest that criminal justice should conform to rational principles. It is a less theoretical work than the writings of Hugo Grotius, Samuel von Pufendorf and other comparable thinkers, and as much a work of advocacy as of theory. In this essay, Beccaria reflected the convictions of the Il Caffè group, who sought to cause reform through Enlightenment discourse. In 1765, André Morellet produced a French translation of On Crimes and Punishments. His translation was widely criticized for the liberties he took with the text. Morellet had the opinion that the Italian text of Beccaria did require some clarification. He, therefore, omitted parts and sometimes added to them. But he mainly changed the structure of the essay by moving, merging, or splitting chapters. These interventions were known to experts, but because Beccaria himself had indicated in a letter to Morellet that he fully agreed with him, it was assumed that these adaptations also had Beccaria's consent in substance. The differences are so great, however, that the book from the hands of Morellet became quite another book than the book that Beccaria wrote.

Principles 

On Crimes and Punishments was the first critical analysis of capital punishment that demanded its abolition. Beccaria described the death penalty as: 
Beccaria cited Montesquieu, who stated that "every punishment which does not arise from absolute necessity is tyrannical".

Regarding the "Proportion between Crimes and Punishment", Beccaria stated that: 

Beccaria also argued against torture, believing it was cruel and unnecessary.

Style 
The book's serious message is put across in a clear and animated style, based in particular upon a deep sense of humanity and of urgency at unjust suffering. This humane sentiment is what makes Beccaria appeal for rationality in the laws.

Influence 

Within eighteen months, the book passed through six editions. It was translated into French in 1766 and published with an anonymous commentary by Voltaire. An English translation appeared in 1767, and it was translated into several other languages. The book was read by all the luminaries of the day, including, in the United States, by John Adams and Thomas Jefferson.

The book's principles influenced thinking on criminal justice and punishment of offenders, leading to reforms in Europe, especially in France and at the court of Catherine II of Russia. In England, Beccaria's ideas fed into the writings on punishment of Sir William Blackstone (selectively), and more wholeheartedly those of William Eden and Jeremy Bentham. The reforms he had advocated led to the abolition of the death penalty in the Grand Duchy of Tuscany, the first state in the world to take this measure.

Thomas Jefferson in his "Commonplace Book" copied a passage from Beccaria related to the issue of gun control: "Laws that forbid the carrying of arms . . . disarm only those who are neither inclined nor determined to commit crimes . . . Such laws make things worse for the assaulted and better for the assailants; they serve rather to encourage than to prevent homicides, for an unarmed man may be attacked with greater confidence than an armed man." His only notation on this passage was, "False idee di utilità" ("false ideas of utility").

References

External links 
On Crimes and Punishment by Cesare Bonesana di Beccaria: at Online Library of Liberty

 

1764 books
Penology
Modern philosophical literature
Works about punishment